Thammathibet Chaiyachet Suriyawong, the Prince Senaphithak or Prince Narathibet, also known as Prince Kung/ Chao Fa Kung (? – 1746), was Viceroy of the front palace of the Kingdom of Ayutthaya, from 1732/33 but he is much more known as one of Thailand's most important poets. He also created the music for the Royal barge procession.

Life

Thammathibet, Prince Senaphithak was the eldest son of King Borommakot (reg. 1733 to 1758) and Princess Aphainuchit or Phra Phan Watsa Yai.

In his poetic works praised for their lyrical language, Thammathibet describes the beauty of the Royal Bark procession, illustrating the work of the rowers, the individual boats, and the sight of the entire procession fleet. Nature, both plant and animal life, are also themes of his poetry. He often deals with the beauty of women. This last topic will eventually turn him into disaster in real life.

Thammathibet and his half-brother Chao Sakaeo (Prince Sunthon Thep) had an argument about an elephant, which had made this overly pompous. In April, 1746, it was reported, he laid siege to the palace of his half-brother, forbade any entrance or exit. Nevertheless, Chao Sakaeo and his sons could enter the palace of the king and bring his complaints there. The King was completely surprised by these clashes. Thammathibet also hurried into the royal palace to place his opponent. But he was not allowed to enter, so he returned to his own palace.

Later, he was quoted before his father, who asked him about the reason for his big-minded behavior, and why he presumed such an authority. Thammathibet remained silent, which gave the King even more. He left his son in jail. Thammathibet was chained in a single cell, and no one was allowed to join him. Meanwhile, the accusations against him increased. King Borommakot entrusted Chao Sakaeo and Chao Krommun Poon (Prince Chitsunthorn), along with Okya Chakri (Chancellor) and the Phraklang, with the prisoner's question, a choice that did not promise anything good. Thammathibet did not say, and was then twice punished with twenty blows, then his soles were burnt.

His most important advisers were also imprisoned and "questioned". They had many things: Thammathibet had made copies of the keys to the chambers of the king, the queen, and the royal concubines. So he could get access to the rooms by night. In addition, his trailers had bought and hidden weapons that should be used at the right moment. And finally, they confessed that Thammathibet was responsible for the death of several monks and the mutilation of some of his subordinates. Thereupon the king ordered fifty blows.

During the further interrogations, Thammathibet confessed that he had visited four of the numerous royal concubines and planned to assassinate the king (his father) and his family and seize power in Ayutthaya. The king gave an order to put Thammathibet fifty more blows and burn his forehead, arms, and legs. In the course of this torture, Thammathibet, the four concubines and some higher counselors of the prince died.

Prince Thammathibet was cremated in Wat Chai Watthanaram in Ayutthaya along with Chao Fa Nim, his father's first concubine, and Chao Sangwan according to Buddhist rite.

Work

The Ruderlieder (Kap He Ruea, กาพย์เห่เรือ) and those Nirat-Dichtungen were not given access to a thrash of the Schulen.

 He Kaki Sam Ton 
 He Sangwat 
He Khruan Yang La Bot 
 Kap Ho Khlong  
 Nirat Than Sok 
 Nirat Than Thongdaeng 
 Lilit Nanthopananthasut Kham Luang 
 Lilit Phra Malai Kham Luang

Issue

Literature 
 Bhawan Ruangslip: Dutch East India Company Merchants at the Court of Ayutthaya: Dutch Perception of the Thai Kingdom, c. 1604-1765. Leiden: Brill 2007. .

Ban Phlu Luang dynasty
Thai poets
Heirs apparent who never acceded
Thai male Chao Fa
Princes of Ayutthaya
18th-century Thai people
Year of birth unknown
1746 deaths